Bob de Vries (born 16 December 1984) is a Dutch former marathon speed skater and long track speed skater. He is the brother of Elma de Vries.

Personal records

De Vries has a score of 151.799 points on the Adelskalendern.

Tournament overview

 DNQ = Did not qualify for the last distance
source:

World Cup

 DQ = Disqualified
 (b) = Division B
 – = Did not participate
 * = 10000 meter

Career highlights

2003–04
 Essent Cup, Overall Men's B-Class, 1st 
2004–05
 Essent Cup, Groningen, 2nd 
 Essent Cup, Alkmaar, 3rd 
 Essent Cup, Overall Men's A-Class, 1st  (juniors)
2005–06
 Essent Cup, Eindhoven, 3rd 
2006–07
 Essent Cup, Eindhoven, 3rd 
 The Greenery Six, Groningen, 2nd 
 Essent Cup, Assen, 3rd 
 Essent Three Days, Groningen day 1 stage 2, 2nd 
 A-Class race, Hoorn, 1st 
 Essent Cup, Alkmaar, 3rd 
 The Greenery Six, Men's A-Class, 1st  (juniors)
2007–08
 KNSB Cup, Heerenveen (1), 1st 
 Essent Cup, Assen (1), 1st 
 KNSB Cup, Haarlem, 3rd 
 Essent Cup, Amsterdam, 2nd 
 KNSB Cup, The Hague, 2nd 
 Essent Cup, Utrecht, 3rd 
 KNSB Cup, Hoorn, 2nd 
 KNSB Cup, Geleen, 1st 
 KNSB Cup, Deventer, 1st 
 IJSCH Natural ice marathon, Haaksbergen, 2nd 
 KNSB Cup, Breda, 3rd 
 Essent Cup, Assen (2), 1st 
 Essent Cup, Eindhoven, 3rd 
 KNSB Cup, Heerenveen (2), 1st 
 KNSB Cup, Alkmaar, 2nd 
 Essent Cup, Overall Men's A-Class, 1st 
 KNSB Cup, Overall Men's A-Class, 1st

References

1984 births
Living people
Dutch male speed skaters
Sportspeople from Friesland
People from Ooststellingwerf
Speed skaters at the 2018 Winter Olympics
Olympic speed skaters of the Netherlands
World Single Distances Speed Skating Championships medalists
21st-century Dutch people
20th-century Dutch people